Osvaldo Virgil National Airport is an airport in the province of Monte Cristi on the north coast of the Dominican Republic. The airport was opened in 2006 for tourism with flights from other Dominican airports. The runway is just north of the city of Monte Cristi. The airport is named after baseball player Ozzie Virgil Sr.

The Monte Cristi non-directional beacon (Ident: MTC) is on the field.

See also

Transport in Dominican Republic
List of airports in Dominican Republic

References

External links
SkyVector - El Montecristi Airport

Airports in the Dominican Republic
Buildings and structures in Monte Cristi Province